"Say It to Me" is a song by English synth-pop duo Pet Shop Boys from their thirteenth studio album, Super (2016). It was released on 16 September 2016 as the album's fourth single. The song did not have a music video to accompany it, and was not included in the set list for their 2016 Super Tour.

Release
"Say It to Me" was released on 16 September 2016 on CD single and in two digital bundles, including remixes by Real Lies, Tom Demac, Offer Nissim and Stuart Price, as well as two previously unreleased B-sides, "A Cloud in a Box" and "The Dead Can Dance". A twelve-inch single was released on 23 September. The cover art was a take on the album art for Super, the title centred in a circle, but designed to look like a dialogue blurb from a comic.

Track listings
CD single
"Say It to Me" (new radio mix) – 3:11
"A Cloud in a Box" – 4:09
"The Dead Can Dance" – 2:57
"Say It to Me" (Stuart Price alternative mix) – 3:35
"Inner Sanctum" (Carl Craig c2 Juiced rmx) – 7:09

Digital EP
"Say It to Me" (new radio mix) – 3:11
"A Cloud in a Box" – 4:09
"The Dead Can Dance" – 2:57
"Say It to Me" (Stuart Price alternative mix) – 3:35

Digital single – Remixes
"Say It to Me" (Tom Demac remix) – 7:23
"Say It to Me" (Real Lies remix) – 5:00
"Say It to Me" (Offer Nissim remix) – 5:00

12-inch single
A1. "Say it to Me" (Real Lies Remix) – 5:00
A2. "Say it to Me" (Tom Demac Remix) – 7:24
B1. "Say it to Me" (Offer Nissim Mix) – 5:00
B2. "Say It to Me" (Stuart Price alternative mix) – 3:35

Charts

References

2016 singles
2016 songs
Pet Shop Boys songs
Song recordings produced by Stuart Price
Songs written by Chris Lowe
Songs written by Neil Tennant